Gmina Sławatycze is a rural gmina (administrative district) in Biała Podlaska County, Lublin Voivodeship, in eastern Poland, on the border with Belarus.

Villages
Gmina Sławatycze contains the villages and settlements of Jabłeczna, Krzywowólka, Krzywowólka-Kolonia, Kuzawka-Kolonia, Liszna, Mościce Dolne, Nowosiółki, Parośla, Pniski, Sajówka, Sławatycze, Sławatycze-Kolonia, Terebiski and Zańków.

Neighbouring gminas
Gmina Sławatycze is bordered by the gminas of Hanna, Kodeń and Tuczna. It also borders Belarus.

References

External links
Polish official population figures 2006

Slawatycze
Biała Podlaska County